The Chief Cook is a 1917 American silent comedy film featuring Oliver Hardy.

Cast
 Billy West as The Star Boarder
 Bud Ross as Boggs (as Budd Ross)
 Oliver Hardy as Babe (as Babe Hardy)
 Ellen Burford as Dolly
 Joe Cohen
 Leo White as Ham

See also
 List of American films of 1917
 Oliver Hardy filmography

External links

Stills of censored scene of Ellen Burford in bathtub

1917 films
American silent short films
American black-and-white films
1917 comedy films
1917 short films
Films directed by Arvid E. Gillstrom
Silent American comedy films
American comedy short films
1910s American films